Simona Isidori (born 10 October 1967) is an Italian former professional tennis player.

Isidori reached a career high singles ranking of 195. Her best WTA Tour performance was at the 1989 Spanish Open, where she won through to the second round. She featured in the qualifying draws for both Wimbledon and the US Open in 1989. 

As a doubles player, she claimed two $25,000 ITF titles, both in 1990 partnering Silvia Farina Elia.

ITF finals

Singles: 2 (1–1)

Doubles: 5 (3–2)

References

External links
 
 

1967 births
Living people
Italian female tennis players